Vile Vicious Vision is the fourth studio album by Polish thrash metal band Acid Drinkers. It was released on October, 1993 in Poland through Loud Out Records. The album was recorded from 5 to 16 June 1993 at HELLENIC Studio, Poznań. The cover art was created by Mariusz Łechtański and Litza and photos by Lech Brzoza and Magda Starosta. Tracks on Vile Vicious Vision was recorded only in two days.

Track listing

Bonus Tracks

Personnel
 Tomasz "Titus" Pukacki - vocal, bass guitar
 Robert "Litza" Friedrich - backing vocal, guitar, lead vocal on track 5
 Dariusz "Popcorn" Popowicz - guitar, vocals on track 9 and 11
 Maciej "Ślimak" Starosta - drums, vocal on track 13
Music and lyrics - Acid Drinkers (except "Then She Kissed Me": Jeff Barry, Ellie Greenwich, Philip Spector)
Engineered - Piotr Madziar
Mixed - Piotr Madziar and Litza

Release history

References

1993 albums
Acid Drinkers albums